Entre-Deux-Mers is a French region, well known as a  Bordeaux wine growing region.

At , it is the largest sub-region of Bordeaux, although, as there are large areas of forest, only half the land is used for growing grapes.

Name 
The name of the region is derived, not from the French word "" ("sea"), but from "" ("tide"). Thus, it means "between two tides", a reference to its location between two tidal rivers.

Wine region and Appellation 

Although both red and white wine is produced in Entre-Deux-Mers, only the dry white carries the appellation d'origine contrôlée (AOC) "Entre-Deux-Mers".

The red is sold as Bordeaux or Bordeaux Supérieur. Many growers switched from the white grape varieties to the more profitable red ones in the mid-20th century.

Syrupy and sweet white wines are also produced in the south of the geographical region : Cadillac, Loupiac, Sainte-Croix-du-Mont.

Characteristics 

The Entre-Deux-Mers appellation has the following characteristics:
 Dry white wine: less than 4 grams / litre of residual sugar;
 Blend of three grape varieties: Sauvignon Blanc (primarily), Sémillon and Muscadelle;
 Minimum alcoholic content of 11.5%.

The wine is typically enjoyed young – within one year of vintage – but has some aging potential, owing to the Sémillon.

References

See also 
 Bordeaux wine regions
 White wine

Bordeaux
Bordeaux wine
Geography of Gironde